Él y ella (He & She or Him & Her) is a Spanish-language talk show broadcast by Telemundo from 1995 until 2001. The show was hosted by Antonio Farré and Gigi Graciette (who also created and produced the show) from 1995 to 1998, and by Guillermo Quintanilla and Sofia Webber from 1998 until the show's cancellation in 2001. It was the first talk show to feature two hosts, with a male ("El") and female ("Ella") exploring problems that affect average couples and individuals. The show aired weekdays at 3:00 p.m. Eastern Time, preceding the Sevcec show.

History

Hosts Antonio Farré and Gigi Graciette (replaced by Guillermo Quintanilla and Sofia Webber in 1998) talked about every imaginable topic about problems that affect average couples and individuals, while different panelists and celebrity guests offered their first hand experience on the different subjects. The show became the highest-rated afternoon show on Telemundo. El y Ella was taped at Raleigh Studios in Los Angeles, California during its early years, sharing its soundstage with fellow talk show, Sevcec. Midway into its run, El y Ella began taping in Mexico City. In 1998, both Farré and Graciette left the show for unknown reasons, and were replaced by Guillermo Quintanilla and Sofia Webber, respectively. The show was cancelled in 2001.

References

External links
 

Telemundo original programming
1995 American television series debuts
2001 American television series endings
1990s American television talk shows
2000s American television talk shows
Spanish-language television programming in the United States